James Dunnigan may refer to:

 James F. Dunnigan (born 1943), author and military-political analyst
 James Dunnigan (politician) (born 1953), American politician in the Utah House of Representatives